Xətai (until 1992, Marksovka) is a village and municipality in the Agstafa Rayon of Azerbaijan.  It has a population of 5,738.  The municipality consists of the villages of Xətai, Qaçaq Kərəm, and Yenigün.

Notable natives 

 Ilham Hasanov — National Hero of Azerbaijan.

References 

Populated places in Aghstafa District